K180 or K-180 may refer to:

K-180 (Kansas highway), a former state highway in Kansas
Opel K 180, an automobile